George Witters (11 September 1876 – 22 February 1934) was a notable New Zealand farmer, horticulturist and conservationist. He was born in Makauri, New Zealand, in 1876.

References

1876 births
1934 deaths
New Zealand farmers
New Zealand conservationists
New Zealand horticulturists
People from the Gisborne District